Andrew Scougal Brand (born 8 November 1957) is a Scottish former professional footballer who played as a goalkeeper. He played in the Football League for several clubs.

He retired from professional football in 1983 to become a police officer in Cheshire. He now lives in North Wales with his family.

References

External links

1957 births
Living people
Scottish footballers
Association football goalkeepers
Everton F.C. players
Crewe Alexandra F.C. players
Hereford United F.C. players
Wrexham A.F.C. players
Witton Albion F.C. players
Blackpool F.C. players
English Football League players